Hilarographa belizeae is a species of moth of the family Tortricidae. It is found in Belize.

The wingspan is about 16.5 mm. The ground colour of the forewings is cream, represented by lines from the costa and dorsum. The terminal area is orange rust with three blackish spots. The hindwings are orange brown, but browner on the periphery.

References

Moths described in 2009
Hilarographini